Mount Sidney is a census-designated place in Augusta County, Virginia. The population as of the 2010 Census was 663.

The Mt. Sidney Historic District and Mt. Sidney School are listed on the National Register of Historic Places.

See also
 Ida Stover Eisenhower

References

Census-designated places in Augusta County, Virginia
Census-designated places in Virginia